Cane Valley is an unincorporated community in Adair County, Kentucky, United States.  Its elevation is 784 feet (239 m).

References

Unincorporated communities in Adair County, Kentucky
Unincorporated communities in Kentucky